Companiganj is an upazila of Noakhali District. The area is famed for water buffalo doi (curd).

History
The Port of Jugdia (presently in Sirajpur Union) gained relevance as an important commercial seaport during the Bengal Sultanate period. With the advent of the Mughals, the Eidagazi Mosque was constructed in Charhazari. In 1853, the British East India Company set up a factory in Jugdia and a textile mill there in 1857. The French East India Company also set up huge textile mills here and these textiles and salt, including the native textiles produced by the Tantis, were exported abroad through the Port of Jugdia. Companiganj was established as a thana (police outpost) in 1888, by the British colonial administrators, named after the British East India Company. The map of Companiganj and Sandwip Upazila at the mouth of the Meghna River estuary and at the confluence of the Bamni rivers changes every few years. During the British rule, there was a Bamni Thana in this area (in Rampur Union). There are also villages named Bamni and Musapur in Sandwip. It is known that people from these two areas emigrated from Sandwip due to river breakage. These two regions of Companiganj and Sandwip had close contact even until the 1960s. The people of Bamni in Sandwip were reportedly the descendants of a Brahmin woman, and when they migrated to Bamni (Rampur), it caused issues due to the class and cultural differences. The Sandwipis of Companiganj are said to maintain a distinct identity to the native Companiganjis.

The 20th century marked an important development of Islamic education in Companiganj. In 1915, the Asria Senior Madrasa was established in Bamni. Eight years later, the Islamia Senior Madrasa was founded in Basurhat. During the Bangladesh Liberation War of 1971, a Razakar force was established in Companiganj by the grandsons of Moulvi Minnat Ali of Bamni. One of their brothers, Rafi Uddin, became the central leader of the Al-Badr force. When the freedom fighters went to liberate the Charfaqira Union by setting up base at the nearby Chaprashi market, freedom fighter Abdur Rob was killed. Salih Ahmad and others were killed by a surprise attack by the Razakars. A brawl took place near the sluice gate on Banchharam Road between the Bengali freedom fighters against the Pakistan Army and their collaborators on 4 September. As a result, six freedom fighters were killed. A number of other encounters took place in Companiganj, with the Liberation of Bamni leading to the death of seven freedom fighters including Sadar BLF Commander Ohidur Rahman Wadud. Their bodies lie in a mass grave near Sluice Gate no 16.

On 2 July 1983, Companiganj Thana was upgraded to an upazila (sub-district) as part of the President of Bangladesh Hussain Muhammad Ershad's decentralisation programme.

Geography
Companigani is bounded by Senbgh and Daganbhuiyan upazilas on the north, Noakhali Sadar and Sandwip on the south, Sonagazi and Mirsharai on the east, Noakhali Sadar on the west. The main rivers are Little Feni and Bamni.

Companiganj (town) stands six km south of Maijdi Road. The town consists of six mouzas. It has an area of 6.5 km2.

Demographics
As of the 2011 Bangladesh census, Companiganj had a population of 183351. Males constitute 49.71% of the population, and females 50.29%. Population density was 601 per km2. The town has one dakbungalow. It has 30,847 households.

Muslims constitute 91.85%, Hindus 8.10% and Christians 0.05%. Residents over eighteen number 83104. The Companiganj has an average literacy rate of 34.5% (7+ years); male 41.5% and female 27.8%; and the national average of 32.4% literate.

Administration
Companiganj Upazila is divided into Companiganj Municipality and eight union parishads: Charelahi, Charfakira, Charhazari, Charkakra, Charparboti, Musapur, Rampur, and Sirajpur. The union parishads are subdivided into 36 mauzas and 45 villages.

Companiganj Municipality is subdivided into 9 wards and 11 mahallas.

Chairmen

Education
A government college, three non-government colleges, two government high schools, twenty-six non-government high schools, nine madrasas, one technical institution, fifty-seven government primary schools and nineteen non-government primary schools. Noted educational institutions include: Basurhat A. H. C. Government High School (1911), Companigong model high school (1982), Kabi Jashim Uddin High School (1986), Bamni High School (1914), Bamni College, Chowdhuryhat College, Basurhat Islamia Senior Madrasa (1914), Bamni Achhia Senior Madrasa (1915), Hazarihat High School, B.M College and Charparboti S. C High School.

English medium - Oxford school and College (2017)

Cultural organisations Club 22, Press Club, Companigonj, three public libraries, one cinema hall and twenty-six playgrounds

Facilities
There are 242 mosques in Companiganj with notable ones including the historic Eidagazi Mosque in Charhazari as well as the Budi Mosque in Basurhat. The Darza Orphanage in Bara Hafez Saheb Bari, Charparbati is a notable orphanage in the upazila.

Notable people
 Mowlovi Amin Ullah Khan Bahadur Shaheb, British Period- undivided Bengals MLA;
 Abu Naser Chowdhury, former parliamentarian
 ASM Enamul Haque, former Member of Parliament
 Hasna bint Jasimuddin, environmentalist and politician
 Moudud Ahmed, 8th Prime Minister of Bangladesh
 Obaidul Quader, Minister of Road Transport and Bridges
 Shahadat Hossain Chowdhury, brigadier and Election Commissioner

See also
 Upazilas of Bangladesh
 Districts of Bangladesh
 Divisions of Bangladesh

References

Companiganj Upazila, Noakhali